The Kit Kat Guest Ranch is a legal, licensed brothel in the US state of Nevada located about  east of Carson City in the unincorporated town of Mound House, in Lyon County, at 48 Kit Kat Drive. The ranch was owned by Dennis Hof until his death in October 2018.

It sits along the east side of a loop at the south end of Kit Kat Drive, which also is the home to two other brothels owned by Hof: The Love Ranch and the Sagebrush Ranch. The name of this brothel is often shortened to the Kit Kat Ranch.

History
The ranch originally opened in 1963, and was first licensed (special use permit) in 1980. The ranch came under the ownership of Jacie Caramella and her mother Shelia in 2001. Porn star Rebecca Love, who worked at the ranch as a guest celebrity at times, was named spokesmodel for the ranch in 2005. At the time it was one of the few brothels in Nevada to regularly feature porn stars such as Dennis Hof's former girlfriend Sunset Thomas. 

The ranch was bought from the Caramellas by Dennis Hof in October 2012. Hof shut the ranch for an extensive multi-million dollar renovation. It reopened in May 2016.

See also 
 Prostitution in Nevada
 List of brothels in Nevada

References

External links
 

Brothels in Nevada
Buildings and structures in Lyon County, Nevada